Saxon is a census-designated place (CDP) in Spartanburg County, South Carolina, United States. The population was 3,424 at the 2010 census.

Geography
Saxon is located at  (34.959621, -81.967066).

Demographics

As of the census of 2000, there were 3,707 people, 1,294 households, and 854 families residing in the CDP. The population density was 1,566.8 people per square mile (603.9/km2). There were 1,587 housing units at an average density of 670.8/sq mi (258.5/km2). The racial makeup of the CDP was 58.27% White, 32.26% African American, 0.27% Native American, 0.65% Asian, 0.03% Pacific Islander, 6.15% from other races, and 2.37% from two or more races. Hispanic or Latino of any race were 12.19% of the population.

There were 1,294 households, out of which 26.1% had children under the age of 18 living with them, 38.8% were married couples living together, 18.6% had a female householder with no husband present, and 34.0% were non-families. 27.7% of all households were made up of individuals, and 9.4% had someone living alone who was 65 years of age or older. The average household size was 2.65 and the average family size was 3.17.

In the CDP, the population was spread out, with 22.7% under the age of 18, 17.5% from 18 to 24, 26.7% from 25 to 44, 22.0% from 45 to 64, and 11.1% who were 65 years of age or older. The median age was 32 years. For every 100 females, there were 107.8 males. For every 100 females age 18 and over, there were 108.1 males.

The median income for a household in the CDP was $22,381, and the median income for a family was $26,118. Males had a median income of $22,099 versus $20,139 for females. The per capita income for the CDP was $11,887. About 18.3% of families and 23.2% of the population were below the poverty line, including 24.3% of those under age 18 and 25.8% of those age 65 or over.

Education
Most of the area is in Spartanburg County School District 6 while a very small portion is in Spartanburg County School District 7.  The latter operates Spartanburg High School.

Spartanburg Methodist College is in Saxon.

Notable person
 William Westmoreland, U.S. Army Chief of Staff from 1968 to 1972

References

Census-designated places in Spartanburg County, South Carolina
Census-designated places in South Carolina